Belovodica is a village in Municipality of Prilep, North Macedonia.

Geography 
The village is located in the Dren mountain range east of Prilep.

History
In the 19th century, Belovodica was a Bulgarian village in the Prilep region of the Ottoman Empire. According to the statistics of Vasil Kanchov's book Macedonia: Ethnography And Statistics published in 1900, Belovodica had a population of 510 people, all Macedonian Christians.

At the outbreak of the Balkan Wars, a person from Belovodica served in the Macedonian-Adrianopolitan Volunteer Corps.

In 1980, Saint George's Church was consecrated by Gavril Povardarski.

According to the 2001 census, Belovodica had a population of 24 people, all Macedonians.

References

Villages in Prilep Municipality